Baďan (earlier also) is a village and municipality in Banská Štiavnica District, in the Banská Bystrica Region of Slovakia.

History
In historical records, the village was first mentioned in 1262. Originally it belonged to the Archbishopric of Esztergom, but King Béla IV gave the village to Bzovík Castle.

Genealogical resources

The records for genealogical research are available at the state archive "Statny Archiv in Banska Bystrica, Slovakia"

 Roman Catholic church records (births/marriages/deaths): 1720-1908
 Lutheran church records (births/marriages/deaths): 1829-1937 (parish A)
 Census records 1869 of Badan are not available at the state archive.

See also
 List of municipalities and towns in Slovakia

External links
http://www.e-obce.sk/obec/badan/badan.html
Surnames of living people in Badan

Villages and municipalities in Banská Štiavnica District